Richard Wilson (born 14 January 1869, date of death unknown) was an Australian cricketer. He played in six first-class matches for Queensland in 1896/97.

See also
 List of Queensland first-class cricketers

References

External links
 

1869 births
Year of death missing
Australian cricketers
Queensland cricketers
Cricketers from Sydney